The Lundar Falcons are a junior "B" ice hockey team based in Lundar, Manitoba. Home games are played at Lundar Arena.

History 
Lundar Falcons were formed for the 2010–11 season as a member of the Keystone Junior Hockey League, where they competed until 2018. 

The team had one of their best seasons in 2012–13 under then head coach Arnie Caplan, who helped guide the team to its first finish above .500 mark. Caplan would go on to coach at Portage College and Waywayseecappo Wolverines. 

For the 2018-19 season the Falcons were one of five teams that departed the Keystone Junior Hockey League and established the Capital Region Junior Hockey League. Despite finishing last in the regular season the Falcons won five games in the playoffs before losing to eventual league champion Selkirk Fishermen in Game 7.

Season-by-season record

Note: GP = Games played, W = Wins, L = Losses, T = Ties, OTL = Overtime Losses, Pts = Points, GF = Goals for, GA = Goals against

Records as of 2017–18 regular season.

Team records

Team scoring leaders
These are the top point-scorers season by season.

Note: Pos = Position; GP = Games played; G = Goals; A = Assists; Pts = Points

Individual records
Season
Most goals in a season: Bryce Horning, 41 (2015–16)
Most assists in a season: Daryl Flett, 37 (2012–13)
Most points in a season: Bryce Horning, 66 (2015–16) 
Most points in a season, defenseman: Roy Ettawacapo, 34 (2012–13)
Most points in a season, rookie: Bryce Horning, 66 (2015-16) 
Most penalty minutes in a season: Orrin Hogue, 190 (2013-14)
Most wins in a season: Derrick Pietsch, 11 (2012–13)

Playoffs
Most goals in a playoff season: Michael LaFreniere, 4 (2011–12) 
Most assists in a playoff season: Michael LaFreniere, 5 (2011–12)
Most points in a playoff season: Michael LaFreniere, 9 (2011–12)
Most points in a playoff season, defenseman: Orrin Hogue, 2 (2010–11)
Most points in a playoff season, rookie: unknown
Most wins in a playoff season: Christopher Lesage, 5 (2018-19)

References

External links
Official website of the Lundar Falcons

Ice hockey teams in Manitoba